Mowinckel's First Cabinet governed Norway between 25 July 1924 and 5 March 1926. It had the following composition:

Cabinet members

|}

Secretary to the Council of State
The title was changed from State Secretary to Secretary to the Council of State on 1 January 1926.

References

Johan Mowinckel's First Government. 25 July 1924 - 5 March 1926 - Government.no

Mowinckel 1
Mowinckel 1
1924 establishments in Norway
1926 disestablishments in Norway
Cabinets established in 1924
Cabinets disestablished in 1926